Inveraray and District Pipe Band is a Grade 1 pipe band based in Inveraray, Scotland.

History
Stuart Liddell, a native of Argyll and one of the world's top solo players began coaching youngsters at Inveraray Primary School in 2003, and registered the band in 2005 with the RSPBA. Liddell believed the community could support a thriving competitive pipe band, even though the region's last pipe band had disbanded in the 1930s.

The band's first competition was at the 2005 Cowal Gathering. Using borrowed drums and their own kilts, the group finished 13th of 19 in the Novice Juvenile division. In 2006, the band finished in the top 6 at all major competitions in Novice Juvenile, and in 2007 won 4 out of 5 majors and the Champion of Champions award. In 2008, the band won the World Championships, Cowal Championships and Champion of Champions in the Juvenile division, and were promoted to Grade 2.

In 2009, the band won all five major Grade 2 contests (Scottish, British, European, World and Cowal Championships), and were promoted to Grade 1.

In 2010, the band's first year in Grade 1, they placed 8th in the Scottish Championships, 7th in the British Championships, 8th in the European Championships, 8th and 9th for 9th overall at the World Pipe Band Championships, and 5th at the Cowal Championships.

In 2013, the band was placed 3rd in the British Championships, 2nd in the European Championships, 3rd in the Scottish Championships, 2nd and 4th in the World Championships and 5th at Cowal. In 2014, the band won its first Major at the European Championships, held in Forres, and was placed second in the World Championships. In 2015 Inveraray was 3rd at the World Championships, and a close 2nd in 2016 behind Field Marshal Montgomery Pipe Band. Inverary won their first World Championships in Grade 1 in 2017, finishing seven points ahead of Field Marshal Montgomery who placed 2nd. The band won the World Championships for the second time in 2019.

Band
The Pipe Major and founder of the band is Stuart Liddell, and the Pipe Sergeant is Alasdair Henderson. The Drum Sergeant is Steven McWhirter, and the Band Manager is Jim McMillan.

The band disbanded the juvenile band in 2013.

Pipe Majors
Stuart Liddell (2005-    )

Pipe Sergeants
 Dougie Campbell (2005-2013)
 Alasdair Henderson (2014- )

Leading Drummers
Graeme McMillan (2005 - 2008)
Steven McWhirter (2008 - )

Discography
Ascension (2013)
A Night in that Land (2022)

References

External links

 
 
 Inverary at Forres in 2014 winning their first major

Scottish pipe bands
2005 establishments in Scotland
Organisations based in Argyll and Bute
World Pipe Band Championships winners